Grant Connell and Patrick Galbraith were the defending champions, but lost in the final this year.

Patrick McEnroe and Jared Palmer won the title, defeating Connell and Galbraith 6–2, 4–6, 6–4 in the final.

Seeds

  Grant Connell /  Patrick Galbraith (final)
  Todd Woodbridge /  Mark Woodforde (semifinals)
  Patrick McEnroe /  Jared Palmer (champions)
  Byron Black /  T.J. Middleton (first round)

Draw

Draw

External links
Draw

ATP Auckland Open
1994 ATP Tour